Joaquim José "Jock" Collaquo (17 March 1934 – 9 January 2012) was a Macau-born Hong Kong field hockey player. He competed in the men's tournament at the 1964 Summer Olympics.

References

External links
 

1934 births
2012 deaths
Macanese people
Macau emigrants to Hong Kong
Hong Kong male field hockey players
Olympic field hockey players of Hong Kong
Field hockey players at the 1964 Summer Olympics
Hong Kong people of Macanese descent